Sean Olsson (born 2 March 1967) is a British bobsledder who competed during the 1990s. He won a bronze medal in the four-man event at Nagano in 1998. He continued competing after Nagano albeit having less success, and eventually moved to coaching

References

 Bobsleigh four-man Olympic medalists for 1924, 1932–56, and since 1964
 DatabaseOlympics.com profile

1967 births
Bobsledders at the 1994 Winter Olympics
Bobsledders at the 1998 Winter Olympics
British male bobsledders
Olympic bobsledders of Great Britain
Olympic bronze medallists for Great Britain
Living people
British Parachute Regiment soldiers
Olympic medalists in bobsleigh
Medalists at the 1998 Winter Olympics